The 2017 KBS Drama Awards, presented by Korean Broadcasting System (KBS), was held on December 31, 2017 at KBS Hall in Yeouido, Seoul. It was hosted by Park Soo-hong, Lee Yoo-ri and Namkoong Min.

Winners and nominees

Presenters

Special performances

See also
2017 MBC Drama Awards
2017 SBS Drama Awards

References

External links
 
 

Korean Broadcasting System original programming
KBS Drama Awards
2017 television awards
2017 in South Korea
December 2017 events in South Korea